Sergeant Getulio is a 1983 Brazilian drama film directed by Hermanno Penna. It was shot in Rio de Janeiro's neighborhood São Cristóvão and Laranjeiras, as well as in Sergipe's municipalities Nossa Senhora da Glória, Aracaju, Barra dos Coqueiros, and Poço Redondo.

Cast
 Lima Duarte as Getúlio
 Orlando Vieira as Amaro
 Luiz A. Barreto
 Fernando Bezerra
 Amaral Cavalcante
 Márcia de Lima
 Ethel de Souza
 Marieta Fontes
 Antonio Leite
 Antônio Lima
 Inez Maciel

Reception
At the 1983 Gramado Film Festival, it won the Best Film Award, while Duarte and Vieira won the Best Actor and Best Supporting Actor respectively. Duarte also won the Best Actor Award at the 5th Havana Film Festival. Sargento Getúlio was nominated for Best Film Award at the 13th Moscow International Film Festival.

References

External links
 

1983 films
1983 drama films
Brazilian drama films
Films shot in Rio de Janeiro (city)
Films shot in Sergipe
1980s Portuguese-language films
Best Picture APCA Award winners
1983 directorial debut films